Henry Frederick of Württemberg-Winnental (16 October 1687, in Stuttgart – 27 September 1734, in Winnental) was a German general. He was the son of Frederick Charles, Duke of Württemberg-Winnental and Margravine Eleonore Juliane of Brandenburg-Ansbach.

Ancestors 

1687 births
1734 deaths
Henry Frederick
Military personnel from Stuttgart
People from the Duchy of Württemberg
Military personnel of the Holy Roman Empire
Sons of monarchs